State Trunk Highway 179 (often called Highway 179, STH-179 or WIS 179) is a state highway in the U.S. state of Wisconsin. It runs east–west in south Wisconsin from in Eastman to near Steuben.

Route description
Starting from WIS 27/CTH-D north of Eastman, WIS 179 meanders eastward. As it travels east, it only intersects CTH-E before reaching WIS 131. At WIS 131 in Steuben, WIS 179 ends there.

History
Initially, WIS 179 used to be part of CTH-D. Since 1947, a large part of CTH-D from Eastman to Steuben became WIS 179.

Major intersections

See also

References

External links

179
Transportation in Crawford County, Wisconsin